Terence John Cobner (born 10 January 1946) is a former Welsh international rugby union player and British Lion. He was born in Blaenavon, Monmouthshire and lives in Pontypool.

Welsh international and British Lion 
A back row forward, or flanker, he scored a try on his debut against Scotland in 1974 at the age of 28, and went on to gain a total of 19 caps for Wales and score a total of two tries, the second coming against France in 1975. Cobner also captained Wales against Australia in his final appearances in 1978.  He toured with the British Lions in 1977 to New Zealand where he played in three of the four tests, and virtually took over as captain of the tour from Phil Bennett in its latter stages.

Pontypool captain for ten years 
He played his club rugby for Pontypool RFC from 1968 till 1981 and was captain of the side for 10 consecutive seasons from 1970 to 1979.

References

1946 births
Living people
Barbarian F.C. players
Blaenavon RFC players
British & Irish Lions rugby union players from Wales
Teachers of Oundle School
People educated at West Monmouth School
Pontypool RFC players
Rugby union flankers
Rugby union players from Blaenavon
Wales international rugby union players
Wales rugby union captains
Welsh rugby union players
Welsh schoolteachers